Kenneth Lovsin (born December 3, 1966) is a Canadian former professional ice hockey defenceman who played in one National Hockey League game for the Washington Capitals during the 1990–91 NHL season against the Pittsburgh Penguins. He failed to register a point despite registering 2 shots and was -2 in the game.

He was also a member of Canada's silver medal winning team at the 1994 Lillehammer Winter Olympic Games.

Career statistics

Regular season and playoffs

International

See also
List of players who played only one game in the NHL

External links

1966 births
Baltimore Skipjacks players
Canadian ice hockey defencemen
Hartford Whalers draft picks
Ice hockey people from Alberta
Ice hockey players at the 1994 Winter Olympics
Living people
Mora IK players
National Hockey League supplemental draft picks
Olympic ice hockey players of Canada
Olympic silver medalists for Canada
People from Northern Sunrise County
Saskatchewan Huskies ice hockey players
Washington Capitals players
Olympic medalists in ice hockey
Medalists at the 1994 Winter Olympics
Canadian expatriate ice hockey players in Sweden